is a Japanese manga artist.

Works
 Killer Boy (1985)
 Metal Box (1989)
 Eater (1991)
 Desert Punk (1997)

References

External links 
 

Living people
Manga artists from Chiba Prefecture
1961 births
People from Chiba (city)